The Rentenmark (RM) was a currency issued on 15 October 1923 to stop the hyperinflation of 1922 and 1923 in Weimar Germany, after the previously used "paper" Mark had become almost worthless. It was subdivided into 100 Rentenpfennig and was replaced in 1924 by the Reichsmark.

History
After the Occupation of the Ruhr in early 1923 by French and Belgian troops, referred to as the Ruhrkampf, the German government of Wilhelm Cuno reacted by announcing a policy of passive resistance. This caused the regional economy of the Ruhr, the industrial heartland of Germany, to almost stop. The occupation authorities reacted to strikes and sabotage with arrests and deportations. Those displaced and left without income by the Ruhrkampf and their families fell back on public income support. Tax revenues plunged as economic activity slowed. The government covered its need for funds mainly by printing money. As a result, inflation spiked and the Papiermark went into freefall on the currency market. Foreign currency reserves at the Reichsbank dwindled.

As hyperinflation took hold, the cabinet of Cuno resigned in August 1923 and was replaced by the cabinet of Gustav Stresemann. After Stresemann reshuffled his cabinet in early October, Hans Luther became Minister of Finance. Working with Hjalmar Schacht at the Reichsbank, Luther quickly came up with a stabilization plan for the currency which combined elements of a monetary reform by economist Karl Helfferich with ideas of Luther's predecessor in office Rudolf Hilferding. With the help of the emergency law (Ermächtigungsgesetz) of 13 October 1923 which gave the government the power to issue decrees on financial and economic matters, the plan was implemented that same day, 15 October 1923.

The newly created Rentenmark replaced the old Papiermark. Because of the economic crisis in Germany after the First World War, there was no gold available to back the currency. Luther thus used Helfferich's idea of a currency backed by real goods. The new currency was backed by the land used for agriculture and business. This was mortgaged (Rente is a technical term for mortgage in German) to the tune of 3.2 billion Goldmarks, based on the 1913 wealth charge called Wehrbeitrag which had helped fund the German war effort from 1914 to 1918. Notes worth RM 3.2 billion were issued. The Rentenmark was introduced at a rate of one Rentenmark to equal one trillion (1012) old marks, with an exchange rate of one United States dollar to equal 4.2 Rentenmarks.

The Act creating the Rentenmark backed the currency by means of twice yearly payments on property, due in April and October, payable for five years. Although the Rentenmark was not initially legal tender, it was accepted by the population and its value was relatively stable. The Act prohibited the recently privatised Reichsbank from continuing to discounting bills and the inflation of the Papiermark immediately stopped. The monetary policy spearheaded by Schacht at the Reichsbank and the fiscal policy of Finance Minister Hans Luther brought the period of hyperinflation in Germany to an end. The Reichsmark became the new legal tender on 30 August 1924, equal in value to the Rentenmark. This marked a return to a gold-backed currency in connection with the implementation of the Dawes Plan. The Rentenbank continued to exist after 1924 and the notes and coins continued to circulate. The last Rentenmark notes were valid until 1948.

Coins
Coins were issued dated 1923, 1924 and 1925 in denominations of 1 Rpf, 2 Rpf, 5 Rpf, 10 Rpf and 50 Rpf. Only small numbers of Rentenpfennig coins were produced in 1925. A few 1 Rpf coins were struck dated 1929. The 1 Rpf and 2 Rpf were minted in bronze, with the 5 Rpf, 10 Rpf, and 50 Rpf coins in aluminium-bronze. These coins had the same design features and motifs as coins of the Reichsmark from the Weimar and early Third Reich periods.

Banknotes

The first issue of banknotes was dated 1 November 1923 and was in denominations of RM 1, RM 2, RM 5, RM 10, RM 50, RM 100, RM 500 and RM 1000. Later issues of notes were RM 10 and RM 50 (1925), RM 5 (1926), RM 50 (1934) and RM 1 and RM 2 (1937).

See also

 1924 in Germany

References

 Act creating the Rentenmark Reichsgzetzblatt Teil I, 17 October 1923
GermanNotes.com (2005). German Paper Money 1871–1999. eBook from germannotes.com

External links
 

Currencies of Germany
Economy of the Weimar Republic
Modern obsolete currencies
1923 establishments in Germany
1948 disestablishments in Germany